Eunice Guthrie Murray (21 January 1878 – 26 March 1960) was a Scottish suffrage campaigner and author. She was the only Scottish woman in the first election open to women in 1918.

Life
Murray was born in Cardross to American born abolitionist parents David Murray and Frances Porter Stoddard. Her father was a leading lawyer and both her parents were both supporters of the women's movement. Murray was educated at St Leonards School, and then undertook voluntary work with the League of Pity. In 1908, she joined the Women's Freedom League, and was soon appointed its secretary for the whole of Scotland outside the major cities. She became its leading figure in Glasgow, and was president of its Scottish Council in 1913. She opposed the undemocratic nature of the Women's Social and Political Union and so did not become involved with it. However she was arrested in November 1913 for addressing a crowd outside Downing Street after she had attended the ''International Woman Suffrage Alliance'' conference in Budapest. Murray did not blame the suffragettes for being militant as she decided that the government was the instigator of their behaviour. Although Emmeline Pankhurst stood down the WSPU from militant activity,  at the start of the 1914-18 war, Murray chaired the September 1917 Scottish Council of Women's Freedom League (for Edinburgh, Dundee, Paisley, Dunfermline and (so-called) Scottish Scattered branches) to review their peaceful Clyde Campaign, and to discuss future policy including  a focus on 'social welfare', and a tour of Scotland raising awareness of the coming  'Representation of the People' Bill.

During World War I, Murray also worked at William Beardmore and Company munitions factory and on confidential business, but also found time to write her first novel, The Hidden Tragedy. She stood in Glasgow Bridgeton as an independent candidate at the 1918 general election, the only woman to stand in Scotland at the election, although she did not come close to winning the seat.

After the war, Murray wrote a memoir of her mother, Frances Murray a memoir in 1920, Scottish Women of Bygone Days in 1930 and A Gallery of Scottish Women in 1935.  She became interested in folklore and wrote Scottish Homespun which was illustrated with pictures of dolls dressed in the outfits she was discussing. Murray made many of these outfits. She campaigned for the creation of a Scottish folk museum.

Murray served on the committee and donated money to the National Trust for Scotland. She never married and died in her family home in Cardross.

See also 

 Frances Murray (suffragist) – her mother
 Sylvia Murray – her sister

References

1878 births
1960 deaths
Independent politicians in Scotland
People educated at St Leonards School
People from Argyll and Bute
Scottish suffragists
Scottish women writers
Scottish activists